Liam Kirk (born 26 March 1997) is an English professional rugby league footballer who plays as a  or  for Sheffield Eagles in the Betfred Championship.

Background
Kirk was born in Leeds, West Yorkshire, England.

Kirk played for Drighligton ARLFC before he joined the Bradford scholarship programme. He is a product of the Bradford Bulls Academy system.

Bradford Bulls
2016 - 2016 Season

Kirk featured in the pre-season friendly against Castleford.  He featured in the Championship Shield Round 6 Workington Town to the Semi Final against Dewsbury.

2017 - 2017 Season

Kirk featured in the pre-season friendlies against Huddersfield and Keighley.

Kirk featured in Round 1 Hull Kingston Rovers to Round 23 against Swinton then in the Championship Shield Game 1 Toulouse Olympique to Game 7 Rochdale. Kirk also played in the 2017 Challenge Cup in Round 4 Featherstone Rovers. He scored against Hull Kingston Rovers (two tries), Batley (one try) and Rochdale (one try).

At the end of the season Kirk signed a two-year contract extension with the Bradford club.

2018 - 2018 Season

Kirk featured in the pre-season friendlies against Halifax RLFC, Sheffield, Dewsbury, Toronto Wolfpack and Keighley. He scored against Halifax (one try).

He featured in round 1 York then in round 7 against Coventry to round 10 Newcastle Thunder. He played in round 12 North Wales Crusaders to round 16 against the Newcastle Thunder then in round 18 York to round 25 Oldham R.L.F.C.. He featured in the semi-final against Oldham and the final against Workington Town. Kirk also played in the 2018 Challenge Cup in round 4 Hunslet R.L.F.C. to round 5 against Warrington.

2019 - 2019 Season

Kirk featured in the pre-season friendlies against York, Dewsbury, Batley and the Toronto Wolfpack.

Kirk played in round 1 Featherstone Rovers to round 17 Leigh then in round 19 Widnes to round 21 Swinton. He also played in round 23 against the Toronto Wolfpack. Kirk also featured in the 2019 Challenge Cup in round 6 against Leeds to the quarter final against Halifax. He scored against Batley (one try).

2020 - 2020 Season

Kirk featured in the pre-season friendlies against Castleford, Leeds, Dewsbury and York. Kirk played in Round 1 against the London Broncos to Round 3 Featherstone then in round 5 against Sheffield. Kirk featured in the 2020 Challenge Cup in Round 4 against the Underbank Rangers.

Oldham
At the end of the 2020 season he signed for Championship side Oldham R.L.F.C.

Sheffield Eagles
In October 2021 Kirk signed for Sheffield Eagles on a two-year deal.

Statistics
Statistics do not include pre-season friendlies.

References

External links
Bradford Bulls profile
Bulls profile
Elite Star profile

1997 births
Living people
Bradford Bulls players
English rugby league players
Oldham R.L.F.C. players
Sheffield Eagles players
Rugby league locks
Rugby league players from Leeds
Rugby league props